Bdellozonium cerviculatum is a species of millipede in the family Polyzoniidae. It is found in North America.

References

Further reading

 

Polyzoniida
Millipedes of North America
Articles created by Qbugbot
Animals described in 1928